NGC 247 (also known as Caldwell 62 and commonly known as the Claw Galaxy) is an intermediate spiral galaxy (although it is sometimes classified as a dwarf spiral galaxy) about 11.1 Mly away in the constellation Cetus. This distance was confirmed in late February 2011. Previous measurements showed that the galaxy was about 12.2 Mly away, but this was proved to be wrong. NGC 247 is a member of the Sculptor Group, and is 70 000 light years in diameter. 

NGC 247 has an unusually large void on one side of its spiral disk. This void contains some older, redder stars but no younger, bluer stars.

Nearby galaxies and galaxy group information

NGC 247 is one of several galaxies that is gravitationally bound to the Sculptor Galaxy (NGC 253). These galaxies form a small core in the center of the Sculptor Group, which is one of the nearest groups of galaxies to the Milky Way. Most other galaxies associated with the Sculptor Group are only weakly gravitationally bound to this core.

References

External links

NGC 0247
NGC 0247
NGC 0247
0247
02758
2758
062b
Dwarf spiral galaxies
17841020
UGCA objects